Lingaraj Misra was an Indian politician. He was a Member of Parliament, representing Odisha in the Rajya Sabha the upper house of India's Parliament as a member of the Indian National Congress.

References

Rajya Sabha members from Odisha
Lok Sabha members from Odisha
Indian National Congress politicians
India MPs 1952–1957
1894 births
1957 deaths